The Venus de Milo is an ancient Greek sculpture that was created during the Hellenistic period, sometime between 150 and 125 BC. It is one of the most famous works of ancient Greek sculpture, having been prominently displayed at the Louvre Museum since shortly after the statue was rediscovered on the island of Milos, Greece, in 1820.

The Venus de Milo is believed to depict Aphrodite, the Greek goddess of love, whose Roman counterpart was Venus. The sculpture is sometimes called the Aphrodite de Milos, due to the imprecision of naming the Greek sculpture after a Roman deity (Venus). Some scholars theorize that the statue actually represents the sea-goddess Amphitrite, who was venerated on the island in which the statue was found.  The work was originally attributed to the 4th century BC Athenian sculptor Praxiteles, but, based upon an inscription on its plinth, it is now widely agreed that the statue was created later, and instead is the work of Alexandros of Antioch. 

The statue is missing both arms, with part of one arm, as well as the original plinth, being lost after the statue's rediscovery.

Description
The statue originally would have had two arms, two feet, both earlobes intact and a plinth. There is a filled hole below her right breast that originally contained a metal tenon that would have supported the separately carved right arm. Without arms, it is unclear what the statue originally looked like, but textile archeologist Elizabeth Wayland Barber notes that the posture of Venus de Milo suggests that she may have been hand spinning.

Discovery and history

Discovery

It is generally asserted that the Venus de Milo was discovered on 8 April 1820 by a Greek farmer named Yorgos Kentrotas, inside a buried niche within the ancient city ruins of Milos. This ancient city is the current village of Trypiti, on the island of Milos (also called Melos, or Milo) in the Aegean, which was then a part of the Ottoman Empire.

Elsewhere, the discoverers are identified as the Greeks Yorgos Bottonis and his son Antonio. Paul Carus gave the site of discovery as "the ruins of an ancient theater in the vicinity of Castro, the capital of the island", adding that Bottonis and his son "came accidentally across a small cave, carefully covered with a heavy slab and concealed, which contained a fine marble statue in two pieces, together with several other marble fragments. This happened in February, 1820". He apparently based these assertions on an article he had read in the Century Magazine.

The Australian historian Edward Duyker, citing a letter written by Louis Brest who was the French consul in Milos in 1820, asserts the discoverer of the statue was Theodoros Kendrotas and that he has been confused with his younger son Georgios (Γεώργιος, transliterated into the Latin alphabet phonetically as Yorgos) who later claimed credit for the find. It was in this cavity, which had three wings, that Kendrotas first noticed the upper part of the statue.

The consensus is that the statue was found in two large pieces (the upper torso and the lower draped legs) along with several herms (pillars topped with heads), fragments of the upper left arm and left hand holding an apple, and an inscribed plinth.

Fame

Upon its discovery in 1820, the Venus de Milo was considered to be a significant artistic finding, but did not gain its status as an icon until later on. The exact circumstances in which she was discovered, however, are uncertain. The Louvre and in turn, French art as a whole, had suffered great losses when Napoleon Bonaparte's looted art collection was returned to their countries of origin. The museum lost some of its most iconic pieces, such as the Vatican Museums' Laocoon and His Sons and the Uffizi Gallery's Venus de' Medici. The hole that the restitutions left in French culture allowed the perfect path for the Venus de Milo to become an international icon. Based on early drawings, the plinth that had been detached from the statue was known to have dates on it, which revealed that it was created after the Classical period, which was the most desirable artistic period. This caused the French to hide the plinth, in an effort to conceal this fact before the statue's introduction to the Louvre in 1821. The Venus de Milo held a prime spot in the gallery, and became iconic, mostly due to the Louvre's branding campaign and emphasis on the statue's importance in order to regain national pride.

The great fame of the Venus de Milo during the 19th century owed much to a major propaganda effort by the French authorities. In 1815, France had returned the Venus de' Medici (also known as the Medici Venus) to the Italians. The Medici Venus, regarded as one of the finest classical sculptures in existence, caused the French to promote the Venus de Milo as a greater treasure than that which they recently had lost. The statue was praised dutifully by many artists and critics as the epitome of graceful female beauty. However, Pierre-Auguste Renoir was among its detractors, calling it "as beautiful as a gendarme".

Evacuation from the Louvre museum during World War II
During the beginning of the German invasions during World War II, Jacques Jaujard, the director of the French Musées Nationaux, anticipating the fall of France, decided to organize the evacuation of the Louvre art collection to the provinces.
Venus de Milo along-with The Winged Victory of Samothrace were kept at Château de Valençay, which was spared the German occupation on a technicality.

Modern use

The statue has greatly influenced masters of modern art; two prime examples are Salvador Dalí's 1936 painting Venus de Milo with Drawers and his The Hallucinogenic Toreador (1969–70) and its repeated images of the statue.

The statue was formerly part of the seal of the American Society of Plastic Surgeons (ASPS), one of the oldest associations of plastic surgeons in the world.

In February 2010, the German magazine Focus featured a doctored image of this Venus giving Europe the middle finger, which resulted in a defamation lawsuit against the journalists and the publication. They were found not guilty by the Greek court.

Inspired works
Many modern artists have been inspired by the statue piece since it first arrived at the Louvre. One of the more notable pieces was created by French Post-Impressionist painter Paul Cézanne who drew a pencil study in 1881. Another inspired work was by René Magritte, who painted a reduced-scale version of plaster, with bright pink and dark blue, entitled  or The Copper Handcuffs in 1931. Even more recently are the works of Neo-Dada Pop artist Jim Dine, who has often utilized the Venus de Milo in his sculptures and paintings since the 1970s. Possibly the most widely-known adaptation is that of Salvador Dalí, with his 1936 creation  (Venus of Milos with Drawers). The Spanish Surrealist created a half-size plaster cast, painted it, and covered the slightly open drawers with metal knobs and fur pom-poms. This inspired recreation of the famous sculpture was meant to display the "goddess of love as a fetishistic anthropomorphic cabinet with secret drawers filled with a maelstrom of mysteries of sexual desires that only a modern psychoanalyst can interpret" (Oppen & Meijer, 2019).

The image of the Venus de Milo is often seen in modern culture, whether it be in magazines, advertisements, or home decor.

Cultural references
The Venus de Milo, as one of the world's most recognized artworks, has been referenced countless times in popular culture.

A common comedic gag is depicting how the statue allegedly lost its arms. In 1960, Charlie Drake performed a comedy sketch which showed museum employees accidentally breaking off the arms while packing it. The 1964 film Carry On Cleo similarly featured a skit which purported to show how the statue lost its arms. In the 1997 Disney film Hercules, the title character skips a stone and inadvertently breaks both arms off the statue. 

A plot to steal the statue is at the center of the 1966 spoof spy film The Last of the Secret Agents?, starring Marty Allen and Steve Rossi.

The Venus de Milo is often featured and parodied in television shows, such as The Tick episode "Armless but Not Harmless", in which villains "Venus and Milo" rob an art museum, and the BBC sitcom Only Fools and Horses, where Del Boy shows Rodney a model of the statue claiming there are sick-minded people in the world who would make such a statue of a disabled person.

Music
The statue is also frequently referenced in music. Notable examples include:
 The 1934 song "Love Is Just Around the Corner" by Lewis E. Gensler and Leo Robin, which contains the lyrics, "Venus de Milo was noted for her charms, but strictly between us, you're cuter than Venus, and what's more you've got arms."
 The 1941 song "Chocolate Shake", by Duke Ellington, which contains the lyrics, "Venus de Milo had charms; she gave the Greeks quite a break. Now that poor gal is minus her arms, from doin' the Chocolate Shake."
 The 1956 song "Brown Eyed Handsome Man", written by Chuck Berry and covered by Buddy Holly, contains the lyrics: "Marlo Venus was a beautiful lass. She held the world in the palm of her hand. She lost both her arms in a wrestling match to win a brown-eyed handsome man."
 "Venus de Milo" is a track on Miles Davis' 1957 album Birth of the Cool.
 "Venus de Milo" is a instrumental track on Prince and the Revolution's 1986 album Parade.
 "Venus", the second song on Television's 1977 debut album Marquee Moon, depicts the singer falling into "the arms of Venus de Milo."
 "Touch Too Much" by AC/DC (lyrics by Bon Scott) describe a woman using a reference to the work: "She had the face of an angel, smiling with sin. A body of Venus with arms."
 Multiple songs by Ricardo Arjona reference the Venus de Milo, including , which features the lyric (translated to English): "No, no, no, I will not trade you for anything, not even for a trip to Fiji with the Venus de Milo..."
 The song "Please Don't Bury Me" by John Prine contains the lyrics "Venus DeMilo can have my arms..."
 The song "Pico de Gallo" by Trout Fishing in America (duo) contains the lyrics "It was Cinco de Mayo, and I was down on the bayou, with my good friend Venus de Milo..."
 The 1997 song "Jupiter" by Jewel opens with the lyrics: "Venus De Milo in her half-baked shell understood the nature of love very well..."
 The song "Wanna B Ur Lovr" by Weird Al Yankovic contains the line: "You'd look like Venus de Milo If I just cut off your arms."
 The song "Carolyn's Booty" by The Presidents of the United States of America contains the line: "She's got the curves just like on the Venus de Milo (Venus de Milo)".

See also
 Aphrodite of Knidos

References

Sources

 
 
 
Venus de Milo: The Oxford Dictionary of Art
 James Grout, Venus de Milo, part of the  Encyclopædia Romana

External links

 Musée du Louvre – Louvre Museum: Venus de Milo
 3D model of Venus de Milo via photogrammetric survey of an 1850 Louvre atelier plaster cast at Skulpturhalle Basel museum
 A Vox documentary discussing the modern history of the Venus

 
1820 archaeological discoveries
Hellenistic sculpture
Ancient Milos
2nd-century BC sculptures
Ancient Greek and Roman sculptures of the Louvre
Archaeological discoveries in Greece
Nude sculptures
Marble sculptures in France
Female beauty